Post-grunge is a derivative of grunge that has a less abrasive or intense tone than traditional grunge. Originally, the term was used almost pejoratively to label mid-1990s rock bands such as Bush, Candlebox and Collective Soul that emulated the original sound of grunge.

In the late 1990s, post-grunge morphed into a more clearly defined style that married the sound and aesthetic of grunge with a less intense and abrasive tone, rising to prominence that lasted in the 2000s.

Characteristics
During the 1990s, a post-grunge sound emerged that emulated the attitudes and music of grunge, particularly its thick, distorted guitars, but with a less intense and less abrasive tone. Unlike a lot of early grunge bands, post-grunge bands often worked through major record labels and incorporated influences from a variety of musical genres including: jangle pop, ska revival, alternative metal and classic rock. Post-grunge music tends to be in mid-tempo and is noted for having "a polished, radio-ready production". Tim Grierson of About.com wrote that musically, post-grunge bands "split the difference between plaintive ballads and aggressive rockers, resulting in songs that combine the two extremes into a sad-eyed, propulsive middle ground". Post-grunge tends to feature the "...same kind of melody as...bubblegum pop" and pop song structures. Sometimes  music features both an electric guitar and an acoustic guitar playing simultaneously. Post-grunge tends to have production quality that is much higher and cleaner than grunge.

Post-grunge lyrics also tend to be about topics such as relationships, romance and drug addiction. According to Geffen, "grunge's frontmen posed with their addictions;  songwriters sought redemption for them". Geffen states that post-grunge songs "fit the mold of songs made for...teenage boys and girls" who were "longing for a distant someone".

Pejorative labels

When grunge became a mainstream genre because of bands such as Nirvana and Pearl Jam, record labels started signing bands that sounded similar to these bands' sonic identities. Bands labeled as  that emerged when grunge was mainstream such as Bush, Candlebox and Collective Soul are all noted for emulating the sound of bands that launched grunge into the mainstream. According to Tim Grierson of About.com, the almost pejorative use of the "post-grunge" label to describe these bands was "suggesting that rather than being a musical movement in their own right, they were just a calculated, cynical response to a legitimate stylistic shift in rock music". During the late 1990s, post-grunge morphed, becoming a derivative of grunge that combined characteristics of grunge with a more commercially accessible tone. During this time, post-grunge bands such as Creed and Nickelback emerged. Grierson wrote:  Grierson also wrote, "Post-grunge was a profitable musical style, but bands like Nirvana and Pearl Jam were beloved partly because of their perceived integrity in avoiding the mainstream. Post-grunge, by comparison, seemed to exist in order to court that very audience."

In the late 2000s and 2010s, the derogatory term "butt rock" gained traction when applied in relation to many post-grunge artists whose popularity peaked  simultaneously with that of the genre itself, such as Nickelback, Creed, Puddle of Mudd, and Hinder. While origins of the term are debatable, it usually implies criticism of raspy vocals overuse and, less often, overly clichéd or negative lyrics.

History

1991–1993: Origins via grunge
 
Even at the height of their popularity, after the release of Nevermind (1991) brought grunge to international attention, Nirvana experienced increasing problems, partly caused by Kurt Cobain's drug addiction and growing dissatisfaction with commercial success. In late 1992, Cobain was photographed in a T-shirt with 'Grunge is Dead' printed on its front at which point the genre's decline started to be widely discussed. Cobain's suicide in 1994, as well as Pearl Jam's touring problems, marked a decline for grunge that year. Problems of addiction for Layne Staley of Alice in Chains led to the band cancelling scheduled dates in 1995. Addiction and legal problems for Scott Weiland of Stone Temple Pilots led to the band having touring problems, causing the band to tour their album Purple for only four months, and their follow up album Tiny Music... Songs from the Vatican Gift Shop for only 6 weeks.

1993–1997: First wave and rise in popularity

When grunge was mainstream, major record labels began signing and promoting bands emulating the genre. In spite of the fact that bands such as Bush and Candlebox have been categorized as grunge, both bands have also been categorized as post-grunge. Even the classic rock band Rush made a contribution to the nascent post-grunge with the 1993 studio album Counterparts and the subsequent releases Test for Echo (1996) and Vapor Trails (2002).

Collective Soul and Live are two other bands categorized as post-grunge that emerged along with Bush and Candlebox. Bush, Candlebox, Collective Soul and Live all achieved mainstream success; Candlebox's self-titled album was certified  by the Recording Industry Association of America (RIAA) and, according to Nielsen SoundScan, sold at least 4,000,000 copies. Its song "Far Behind" peaked at number 18 on the Billboard Hot 100. Collective Soul's song "Shine" peaked at number 11 on the same chart and was certified gold by the RIAA in September 1994. Collective Soul's album Hints Allegations and Things Left Unsaid was certified 2× platinum by the RIAA, and the band's self-titled album released in 1995 was certified 3× platinum by the RIAA. Bush's debut studio album Sixteen Stone was certified  by the RIAA and the band's second studio album Razorblade Suitcase, which peaked at number 1 on the Billboard 200, was certified 3× platinum by the RIAA. Carl Williott of Stereogum called Bush's album Sixteen Stone "a harbinger of  pop dominance". Live's album Throwing Copper was certified 8× platinum by the RIAA, and the band's album Secret Samadhi was certified 2× platinum by the RIAA. Both Throwing Copper and Secret Samadhi peaked at number 1 on the Billboard 200.

In 1995, former Nirvana drummer Dave Grohl's newer band Foo Fighters helped to popularize post-grunge and define its parameters, becoming one of the most commercially successful rock bands in the United States, aided by considerable airplay on MTV. Like grunge bands such as Nirvana, Pearl Jam, Soundgarden, and Alice in Chains, the post-grunge band Candlebox was from Seattle, but post-grunge was marked by a broadening of the geographical base of grunge, with bands categorized as post-grunge such as York, Pennsylvania's Live, Atlanta, Georgia's Collective Soul, Australia's Silverchair and England's Bush, who all paved the way for later post-grunge bands. Female solo artist Alanis Morissette's 1995 album Jagged Little Pill, which is considered a post-grunge album, became a hit and was certified 16× platinum by the RIAA in 1998  having sold at least 15,000,000 copies in the United States. Matchbox Twenty's 1996 debut album, Yourself or Someone Like You, was a success; it was certified 12× platinum by the RIAA.

1997–2009: Second wave and peak popularity

With the first wave of post-grunge bands losing popularity, post-grunge morphed in the late 1990s and early 2000s, gaining further popularity with bands such as Creed, Three Days Grace, 3 Doors Down, Puddle of Mudd, Staind, Audioslave, Incubus, Hoobastank, Fuel, and Nickelback, abandoning some of the angst and anger of the original movement for more conventional anthems, narratives and romantic songs. They were followed in this vein by newer acts such as Shinedown and Seether. Creed's albums My Own Prison, released in 1997, and Weathered, released in 2001, were both certified  by the RIAA. Weathered sold at least 6,400,000 copies in the United States. Creed's album Human Clay, released in 1999, was certified diamond by the RIAA and sold at least 11,690,000 copies in the United States. Human Clay song "With Arms Wide Open" peaked at number 1 on the Billboard Hot 100.

Nickelback broke into the mainstream in the early 2000s; their song "How You Remind Me" peaked at number 1 on the Billboard Hot 100. The Nickelback album that featured the song, Silver Side Up, was certified 6× platinum by the RIAA and sold at least 5,528,000 copies in the United States. Nickelback's next album, The Long Road, was certified 3× platinum by the RIAA and sold at least 3,591,000 copies in the United States. The album's song "Someday" peaked at number 7 on the Billboard Hot 100 and number 1 on both the Canadian Singles Chart and the Adult Top 40 chart. Nickelback's album All the Right Reasons was certified 6× platinum by the RIAA fourteen months after being released. Four years after being released, the album was certified 8× platinum by the RIAA. In March 2017, All the Right Reasons was certified diamond by the RIAA. Staind's album Break the Cycle peaked at number 1 on the Billboard 200 and sold at least 716,000 copies in its release week, and, According to Nielsen SoundScan, sold at least 4,240,000 copies in 2001. Break the Cycle song "It's Been Awhile" peaked at number 5 on the Billboard Hot 100.

3 Doors Down's debut studio album The Better Life was certified 6× platinum by the RIAA and sold at least 5,653,000 copies in the United States. The Better Life song "Kryptonite" peaked at number 3 on the Billboard Hot 100 and number 1 on the Mainstream Top 40 chart. 3 Doors Down's second studio album Away from the Sun was certified  by the RIAA and sold at least 3,863,000 copies in the United States. Lifehouse achieved mainstream success in the early 2000s; their song "Hanging by a Moment", which peaked at number 2 on the Billboard Hot 100, was the most played song on the radio in 2001. Puddle of Mudd broke into the mainstream in the early 2000s; their album Come Clean was certified  by the RIAA and the album's songs "Blurry" and "She Hates Me" both reached very high positions on the Billboard Hot 100. "Blurry" peaked at number 5 on the Billboard Hot 100 and "She Hates Me" peaked at number 13 on the Billboard Hot 100. "She Hates Me" also peaked at number 7 on the Top 40 Mainstream chart. The band Default became popular with their song "Wasting My Time". It peaked at number 13 on the Billboard Hot 100.

The post-grunge band Cold's song "Stupid Girl" peaked at number 87 on the Billboard Hot 100.  band Crossfade's song "Cold" peaked at number 81 on the Billboard Hot 100, number 23 on the Top 40 Mainstream chart, number 39 on the Pop 100 chart, number 28 on the Pop 100 Airplay chart, and number 57 on the Hot Digital Songs chart. It was certified gold by the RIAA in December 2006. Crossfade's  was certified platinum by the RIAA in August 2005. Three Days Grace broke into the mainstream during the 2000s; their song "Just Like You" peaked at number 55 on the Billboard Hot 100 and number 1 on both the Mainstream Rock chart and the Modern Rock Tracks chart.

The Three Days Grace song "I Hate Everything About You" peaked at number 55 on the Billboard Hot 100 and number 28 on the Pop Songs chart. In 2006, Three Days Grace released their album One-X, which was certified 3× platinum by the RIAA. The album's song "Pain" peaked at number 44 on the Billboard Hot 100, number 47 on the Pop 100 chart and number 35 on the Hot Digital Songs chart. One-X song "Never Too Late" peaked at: number 71 on the Billboard Hot 100, number 12 on the Top 40 Mainstream chart, number 19 on the Pop 100 chart, number 17 on the Pop 100 Airplay chart, number 30 on the Hot Digital Songs chart, number 18 on the Hot Canadian Digital Singles chart, number 13 on the Adult Top 40 chart and number 1 on the Hot Adult Top 40 Recurrents chart. Daughtry broke into the mainstream in 2006 with the release of their self-titled debut album. Stephen Thomas Erlewine of AllMusic noted the  sound of the album. It sold at least 5,040,000 copies in the United States. The band Flyleaf's song "All Around Me" peaked at: number 40 on the Billboard Hot 100, number 12 on the Top 40 Mainstream, number 17 on the Pop 100, number 15 on the Pop 100 Airplay, number 38 on the Hot Digital Songs and number 23 on the Adult Top 40. Flyleaf's self-titled album was certified platinum by the RIAA.

See also 
 List of post-grunge bands

References

 
1990s in music
2000s in music
1990s fads and trends
2000s fads and trends
Grunge
20th-century music genres
21st-century music genres
American rock music genres